Ryan is a populated place in Roane County, West Virginia, United States. 

The community was named after Thomas P. Ryan, an early settler and local minister.

References

Geography of Roane County, West Virginia